Ran Ben Shimon (born 28 November 1970) is a former Israeli football player and the current manager of F.C. Ashdod.

Playing career
Ben Shimon was born in Petah Tikva, Israel, to a Jewish family. In 1987, Ben Shimon began his professional career in Maccabi Petah Tikva senior side, where he played until the 1994–95 season, winning two Toto Cup Artzit trophies (then second division) and on his last season he won the Toto Cup Leumit (then the first division), after a 2–1 victory against Maccabi Tel Aviv, scoring the second goal for Maccabi Petah Tikva in an accurate free kick.

Avram Grant, who managed Hapoel Haifa was interested in Ben Shimon in order the strengthening their defense. Maccabi Petah Tikva, headed by Avi Luzon were adamantly opposed. Robbie Shapira, then president of Hapoel Haifa and Avi Luzon agreed on an arbitrator. of which stated that no amount can release the player from Petah Tikva. Haifa was hardly surprised as Luzon was the one who picked the arbitrator. In the end, after Hapoel Haifa lost 4–1 to Maccabi Tel Aviv in the Toto Cup, forcing Grant to look for defensive reinforcement, and Shapira agreed to buy Ben Shimon for 450,000 USD. The amount spent was also a significant for the new era in the Israeli football, which continued to struggle against Maccabi Haifa on players such as Tal Banin and Reuven Atar, and raised the bar on prices of players and their wages significantly.

In Hapoel Haifa Ben Shimon became a leader, and then the captain in the 1999 League championship season guided under Eli Guttman. In 2001, he won the Toto Cup with Hapoel Haifa. Ben Shimon also had 34 appearances in the Israeli national football team. Ben Shimon also play in Hapoel Petah Tikva in the 2001–02 season and in Bnei Yehuda in the 2002–03 season before retired from active football.

Managerial career
After retiring from playing, he started coaching the youth team of Maccabi Tel Aviv and then as a manager at Hapoel Haifa. Ben Shimon did not continue after he failed in his efforts to promote the team to the Israeli Premier League.

During 2006–07 season, he coached Ironi Kiryat Shmona and promote her from Liga Leumit to the Israeli Premier League for the first time in its history. Subsequent season, Ben Shimon led the team to third place in the league, which gave her a ticket to the UEFA Cup.

In April 2008, following his success in Ironi Kiryat Shmona, Maccabi Tel Aviv announced on the picking Ben Shimon on its manager in the 2008–09 season. Before the start of the season there were great hopes in the tean, mainly due to highly purchases of players and the amount of money that was invested in the team by the owner Alex Shnaider. Nevertheless, the team did not produce good football and after just eight league rounds of which the team achieved only two victories, Maccabi Tel Aviv sacked Ben Shimon. On 12 April 2009, Ben Shimon returned as the manager of Ironi Kiryat Shmona after the resignation of Eli Cohen. and help guided the team to its first cup, the Toto Cup Leumit and also guided the team in the promotion to the Israeli Premier League. He also guided the team to win the 2010–11 and the 2011–12 Toto Cup Al trophies and the 2011–12 Israeli Premier League championship.

Ben Shimon made a step on his managerial career outside Israel, as he was named manager of AEK Larnaca, in July 2012.

He returned to Israel to take charge of Hapoel Tel Aviv in the summer of 2013. His first official games ended disappointingly, as Hapoel lost to Pandurii in the Europa League qualifiers.

Honours

As a player
with Hapoel Haifa
Israeli football championships (1): 1998–99
Toto Cup Leumit (First division) (1): 2000–01

with Maccabi Petah Tikva
Toto Cup Leumit (First division) (1): 1994–95
Toto Cup Artzit (Second division) (2): 1989–90, 1990–91

As a manager
with Ironi Kiryat Shmona
Israeli football championships (1): 2011–12
Liga Leumit (2): 2006–07, 2009–10
Toto Cup Al (First division) (2): 2010–11, 2011–12
Toto Cup Leumit (Second division) (2): 2006–07, 2009–10

with Maccabi Petah Tikva
Toto Cup Al (First division) (1): 2015–16

Personal life
Ben Shimon's older brother Asi was also a footballer and they both played together in Maccabi Petah Tikva.

Managerial statistics
Managerial statistics are only as coach of the national football team of Cyprus, but managerial statistics as manager of the other clubs, are not available.

References

External links
 

1970 births
Living people
Israeli Jews
Israeli footballers
Israeli football managers
Maccabi Petah Tikva F.C. players
Hapoel Haifa F.C. players
Hapoel Petah Tikva F.C. players
Bnei Yehuda Tel Aviv F.C. players
Hapoel Haifa F.C. managers
Hapoel Ironi Kiryat Shmona F.C. managers
AEK Larnaca FC managers
Hapoel Tel Aviv F.C. managers
Maccabi Petah Tikva F.C. managers
Beitar Jerusalem F.C. managers
Liga Leumit players
Israeli Premier League players
Footballers from Petah Tikva
Expatriate football managers in Cyprus
Israeli expatriate football managers in Cyprus
Cyprus national football team managers
Association football defenders
Israel international footballers